Toquepala Caves are located near Toquepala mine, about  from the city of Tacna, in the extreme southeast of Peru. They are notable for a number of rock paintings. The best known of them is the cave named Abrigo del Diablo ("Devil's rock face").

Geography 
Situated in the western Andes, they are in the Moquegua Region of the Osmore River. The two Toquepala Caves in the high Sierra are located near the Quebrada Cimarron or along the Rio Locumba, which is a dry stream flowing from the Sierra to the desert. The best known of the caves is "Abrigo del Diablo".

History 
The caves were seasonally occupied. The art attained its peak when the Collawa ethnic group lived here during the Paleolithic or Stone Age period. Archaeological research in the region revolved around the Asana site, as well as the Middle Horizon (500-1000AD) and the lower valley pre-Hispanic sites. Important archaic caves discovered in the Osmore River Basin were the Toquepala Caves. This cave became famous after copper was found in the valley and South Peru Copper Corporation started exploration of the Cuajone mines. The cave was studied in 1963 at the initiative of South Peru Copper Corporation. They found a large cache of artifacts during their mining operations and funded the study of the paintings in the caves by archeologists from Lima.) The team was led by Jorge C. Muelle, Director of the Museo Nacional de Arqueología, Antropología e Historia del Perú which resulted in the discovery of the rupestral art (drawings inscribed on rocks in the caves).

The detailed exploration of the caves was undertaken by Roger Ravines of the Museo Nacional de Arqueología, Antropología e Historia del Perú in 1965. The investigations revealed pre-ceramic habitation of the caves dated to 7,650 BC (10,000 BC is also mentioned). In one pit, remnants of paints along with brush wood were found at the same depth. He published his findings in 1965. During the investigations, a fence was erected around the caves to prevent intruders from vandalizing the rock paintings. In spite of this measure there were incidents of surreptitious entry to the caves in which some of the rock paintings were damaged. Since then stronger security fencing has been arranged.

Features 
The caves have rock art of gatherer-hunters who are inferred to have lived in the caves about 10,000 years ago.  There are more than 50 rock paintings drawn by the inhabitants of the caves of the Palaeolithic age of which 30 were studied.  These scenes depict armed people hunting the  guanaco cameloid and Andean religious symbols. The figures drawn are of animals, predominantly guanacos (cameloids). The scene depicted is of hunting by the humans who are corralling and killing a group of guanacos. The humans are in a posture of attacking the animals with axe, lances, and spear throwers. However, bow and arrow are not part of these scenes of rock art. They are painted in seven colours. Red was the dominant colour; yellow and green are also mentioned. The paint was made from hematite.

See also 
 Andean preceramic
 Art of the Upper Paleolithic
 List of Stone Age art

References

Bibliography

Further reading

External links 
 

Prehistoric art
Archaeological sites in Peru
Caves of Peru
Rock art in South America
Archaeological sites in Tacna Region
Landforms of Tacna Region
Andean preceramic
Rock shelters